Sukhdeep Singh Bhogal (born 12 October 1988), better known as L-FRESH The LION is a hip hop artist and producer from Sydney, Australia. The acronym F.R.E.S.H. stands for Forever Rising Exceeding Sudden Hardships, while the L and LION refer to his middle name, Singh, which is given to Sikh men. He has been described as one of Australia's most important rappers. Born in the city of Liverpool in Sydney's South West, L-FRESH The LION caught the attention of his peers and the Australian music scene when he supported Nas during the hip hop icon's first headline tour of Australia in 2009. He released his debut album, One, in 2014, before signing a record deal with one of Australia's leading independent record labels, Elefant Traks, in early 2015. His follow up album, Become (2016), earned him wider industry accolades including an ARIA nomination for Best Urban Album.

At the height of the COVID-19 pandemic in Australia, L-FRESH The LION released his critically acclaimed third album, SOUTH WEST (2020). It ranked #13 in Double J's 50 best albums of 2020 and led to L-FRESH The LION being nominated as Double J's 2020 Australian Artist of the Year. The 14-track album is a letter to his younger 13-year-old self, with messages of confidence, appreciation of his Sikh & Punjabi cultural background, self-empowerment and decolonization. He co-produced the album with Houston-LA-Sydney producer, Kambui 'ZiG' Parker, with additional production by Mike Elizondo (Dr. Dre, Eminem, 50 Cent), Damn Moroda, Sergiio and ultmt. (Phife Dawg from A Tribe Called Quest).

In 2019, the Sydney Kings basketball franchise enlisted L-FRESH The LION to write and perform their team song. WE THE KINGS was released before the launch of the 2019-20 National Basketball League season and performed for the first time by L-FRESH The LION in front of a NBL record-breaking crowd at Qudos Bank Arena.

L-FRESH The LION is the founder and Artist Director of 'Conscious', an annual year-long hip-hop artist development program run by Campbelltown Arts Centre. The program supports the development and career pathways of socially minded hip hop artists with connections to Western Sydney. Since 2018, the program has worked with artists such as A.GIRL, Becca Hatch, Jessica Jade, Nardean, Mirrah, Spvrrow, Slim Set and T Breezy.

In 2017 and 2018, L-FRESH The LION was selected by YouTube to be an Australian representative for their global Creators for Change initiative. His music video RACI$T / OUR WORLD premiered at the Tribeca TV Festival alongside 2 other Creators for Change projects. He then went on to perform the song at YouTube's Brandcast event held in Sydney at the Hordern Pavilion. The event was headlined with a performance by Sir Elton John. His 2018 Creators for Change project, a short documentary called Culture Strong, won Best Editor and Runner-up Best in the West at the Made in the West Film Festival, while also being nominated for Best Director, Best Cinematographer and Best Sound Design. L-FRESH The LION closed out his 2018 involvement with the YouTube Creators for Change initiative by performing OUR WORLD at the United Nations Headquarters in New York as part of an educational event in observance of the International Day for Tolerance.

Personal life
L-FRESH The LION was born to Sikh parents from India. He grew up in south-west Sydney, speaking Punjabi at home but English at school. In 2020, he was described as in his early 30s.

Career 
In 2009, L-FRESH The LION supported Nas during his first headline tour of Australia.  In 2012, he released The LION Speaks.

In May 2014, L-FRESH The LION released his debut studio album One. In 2015 L-FRESH The LION was signed to Elefant Traks.  In May 2016, L-FRESH The LION released his second studio album, Become which peaked at number 55 on the ARIA Charts.  At the ARIA Music Awards of 2016 it was nominated for Best Urban Album.

L-FRESH The LION was one of the 5-person Australian jury at the Eurovision Song Contest 2018.

L-FRESH The LION cites the work of Tupac Shakur as influential, both on his music and in contributing to the development of his awareness of his Sikh heritage.

In 2022 Bhogal made his acting debut in an episode of the ABC television programme, Summer Love.

Discography

Studio albums

Extended plays

Singles

Awards and nominations

ARIA Music Awards 
The Australian Recording Industry Association Music Awards (commonly known informally as ARIA Music Awards or ARIA Awards) is an annual series of awards nights celebrating the Australian music industry, put on by the Australian Recording Industry Association (ARIA).
|-
| ARIA Music Awards of 2016
| Become
| Best Urban Album
| 
|-

AIR Awards
The Australian Independent Record Awards (commonly known informally as AIR Awards) is an annual awards night to recognise, promote and celebrate the success of Australia's Independent Music sector.

|-
| AIR Awards of 2014
|One 
| Best Independent Hip Hop Album
| 
|-
| AIR Awards of 2017
| Become
| Best Independent Hip Hop Album
| 
|-

Environmental Music Prize
The Environmental Music Prize is a quest to find a theme song to inspire action on climate and conservation. It commenced in 2022.

! 
|-
| 2022
| "Mother" (featuring Moza and Mirrah)
| Environmental Music Prize
| 
| 
|-

J Awards
The J Awards are an annual series of Australian music awards that were established by the Australian Broadcasting Corporation's youth-focused radio station Triple J. They commenced in 2005.

|-
| J Awards of 2020
| L-FRESH The LION
| Double J Australian Artist of the Year
| 
|-

Music Victoria Awards
The Music Victoria Awards are an annual awards night celebrating Victorian music. They commenced in 2006.

! 
|-
| Music Victoria Awards of 2014
| One
| Best Hip Hop Album
| 
| 
|-

National Live Music Awards
The National Live Music Awards (NLMAs) are a broad recognition of Australia's diverse live industry, celebrating the success of the Australian live scene. The awards commenced in 2016.

|-
| National Live Music Awards of 2016
| L-FRESH The LION
| Live Hip Hop Act of the Year
| 
|-
| National Live Music Awards of 2017
| L-FRESH The LION
| Live Hip Hop Act of the Year
| 
|-
| National Live Music Awards of 2020
| L-FRESH The LION
| Musicians Making a Difference
| 
|-

References

Australian hip hop musicians
Australian people of Indian descent
Living people
Australian male rappers
Rappers from Sydney
Australian musicians
1988 births